Bromfield railway station may refer to the following stations in England:

 Bromfield railway station (Cumbria)
 Bromfield railway station (Shropshire)